MV Struma was a small ship with a long history that included a number of changes of use and many changes of name. She was built in 1867 as a British marquess's luxury steam yacht and ended up 75 years later as a Greek and Bulgarian diesel ship for carrying livestock. She was launched as Xantha, but subsequently carried the names Sölyst, Sea Maid, Kafireus, Esperos, Makedoniya and finally Struma.

As Struma she tried to take nearly 800 Jewish refugees from Romania to Palestine in December 1941. Turkey detained her in Istanbul because Britain refused to admit her passengers to Palestine. In February 1942 a Soviet submarine torpedoed and sank Struma in the Black Sea after Turkish authorities had towed her out to sea and cast her adrift.

Building

Palmers Shipbuilding and Iron Company of Jarrow in North East England built her in 1867 as the iron-hulled yacht Xantha for Henry Paget, 2nd Marquess of Anglesey, who was a courtier to Queen Victoria and Lord Lieutenant of Anglesey in North Wales.

She was built with a 40 NHP Palmer's compound steam engine and three schooner-rigged masts.

Changes of owner, length and use
In 1871 Xantha was registered at Colchester. In 1873 she was acquired by a Thomas Chivers. In 1877 she was acquired by a William Barneby. In 1887 she was acquired by a Harry Edwards.

In 1888 she was renamed Sölyst and registered at South Shields. In the same year her original compound steam engine was replaced with a 49 NHP Ernest Scott & Co quadruple-expansion steam engine. In 1892 she was acquired by a Charmes McIver, who renamed her Sea Maid and registered her at Liverpool. In 1895 she was acquired by a John Phipps.

In 1901 she was acquired by DE Hadji Constanti and Brothers of Syros, who renamed her Kaphireus. One source suggests that in 1913 during the Balkan Wars the Kingdom of Greece requisitioned her as a troopship to take soldiers from Chalkidiki to Amphipolis. In 1916 Thrakiki Atmoploia ("Thracian Steamships") acquired her and used her as a coastal trading vessel. At an unknown date she passed to Socratis Goumaris and Company of Thessaloniki, who renamed her Esperos. In 1930 she was acquired by Giorgios Mylonas, who registered her in Thessaloniki.

In 1933 Mylonas sold her to a Bulgarian owner, Dimiter Kenkov, who renamed her Makedoniya, based her in the port of Varna and used her to carry cattle on the River Danube. Lloyd's Register of Shipping does not list her as Makedoniya, and she last appears as Esperos in the 1934 edition. If she was no longer ocean-going she may have been de-registered. One source claims Makedoniya was not in service after 1937.

In 1941 Kenkov sold her to Compañía Mediterránea de Vapores Limitada, which was controlled by a Greek shipping agent, Jean D Pandelis. He renamed her Struma and registered her under the Panamanian flag of convenience

At some date one of the ship's three masts had been removed. Lloyd's Register of Shipping lists her as still having her steam engine in 1934, but within a few years it had been replaced with a three-cylinder marine diesel engine built by Benz & Cie. of Mannheim in Germany. Some sources claim that the diesel engine had been salvaged from a wreck sunk in the Danube.

Sinking

In 1941 the New Zionist Organisation and the Betar Zionist youth movement chartered Struma from Jean Pandelis to take Jewish refugees from Romania to Palestine. On 12 December 1941 she left the port of Constanța in Romania carrying 10 crew and about 781 refugees. Her diesel engine was not working so a tug towed Struma out to sea. She drifted overnight while her crew tried in vain to start her engine. She transmitted distress signals and on 13 December the tug returned and the tug's crew repaired Strumas engine in exchange for the passengers' wedding rings. Struma then got under way but by 15 December her engine had failed again and she was towed into Istanbul in Turkey.

While Turkish mechanics made unsuccessful attempts to repair Strumas engine, there was a 10-week impasse between British diplomats and Turkish officials over the fate of the refugees. Because of Arab and Zionist unrest in Palestine, Britain was determined to minimise Jewish immigration to Palestine under the terms of the White Paper of 1939. Under pressure from Britain, Turkey denied the refugees permission to come ashore. One pregnant refugee who suffered a miscarriage was allowed to disembark and admitted to an Istanbul hospital.

On 23 February 1942 Turkish authorities boarded Struma. Her engine still did not work so they towed her back out into the Black Sea and cast her adrift about 10 miles off Istanbul. On the morning of 24 February the  torpedoed her. Struma sank quickly and many people were trapped below decks and drowned.

Many others aboard survived the sinking and clung to pieces of wreckage, but for hours no rescue came and all but one of them died from drowning or hypothermia. Strumas First Officer clung to a piece of wreckage that was floating in the sea along with a 19-year-old refugee, David Stoliar. The officer died overnight but Turks in a rowing boat rescued Stoliar the next day: the only survivor of 791 people (781 Jewish refugees and 10 crew members, some Jewish) who were aboard.

Memorials at Ashdod and Holon in Israel commemorate those who were killed by her sinking. Struma wreck has not yet been found, although an attempt to do so was made in 2000.

References

Sources

External links
 MV Struma disaster on Yad Vashem website

1867 ships
Maritime incidents in February 1942
Schooners
Ships sunk by Soviet submarines
Ships of Panama
Steamships of Bulgaria
Steamships of Greece
Steamships of the United Kingdom
Steam yachts
Ships built on the River Wear
World War II shipwrecks in the Black Sea